Brownout  is the only studio album of American band Head Set.

Track listing
All music and lyrics by Head Set

Personnel
Ryan Kirk - vocals, guitar, keyboards, digital editor on "Disconnexion"
Taylor Stacy - bass, backing vocals
Sean Furlong - drums
Chris Fudurich - keyboards, digital editing
Jim Goodwin - producer
Adam Beilenson and Michael Kerns - executive producers
John F. Matousek - mastering
Alex Patsavas - additional vocals
Brad Kluck - additional vocals
David Frankham - additional vocals
Jackie Vic - additional vocals
Daniel Meyer - guitar solo

2000 albums